Svistella is an Asian genus of "sword-tail crickets", in the subfamily Trigonidiinae and has now been assigned to the tribe Trigonidiini.

Species
Svistella species are recorded from: Japan, Korea, China, Vietnam, Peninsular Malaysia and Sumatra.  The Orthoptera Species File lists:
 Svistella anhuiensis He, Li & Liu, 2009
 Svistella argentata Ma, Jing & Zhang, 2019
 Svistella bifasciata (Shiraki, 1911)type species (as Paratrigonidium bifasciatum Shiraki)
 Svistella chekjawa Tan & Robillard, 2012
 Svistella dubia (Liu & Yin, 1993)
 Svistella fallax He, Li & Liu, 2009
 Svistella fuscoterminata He & Liu, 2018
 Svistella rufonotata (Chopard, 1932)

References

External links
 

Ensifera genera
Trigonidiidae
Orthoptera of Asia